Nuestra Belleza Baja California 2011, was held in the Jardines de Canal 12 in Tijuana, Baja California on June 17, 2011. At the conclusion of the final night of competition Gabriela Acuña of Tecate was crowned the winner. Acuña was crowned by outgoing Nuestra Belleza Baja California titleholder Nancy Galaz. Five contestants competed for the title.

Results

Placements

Special awards

Judges
Álvaro Ávila
Bibi Uribe - TV Hostess
Julio Rodríguez - Tijuanarte Director
Eduardo Góngora - Doctor
Ana Laura Corral - National Coordinator of Nuestra Belleza México

Background Music
Efecto Iguana

Contestants

References

External links
Official Website

Nuestra Belleza México
Beauty pageants in Tijuana